Tutong–Telisai Highway is a major highway in Tutong District, Brunei.

Roads and Highways in Brunei
Pan Borneo Highway